La Région-Sherbrookoise was a former regional county municipality in the Canadian province of Quebec.  Prior to September 12, 1998 it was known as Sherbrooke Regional County Municipality.

It ceased to exist when most of it amalgamated into the expanded city of Sherbrooke on January 1, 2002.

La Région-Sherbrookoise RCM consisted of:
 the Municipality of Ascot
 the City of Bromptonville
 the Municipality of Deauville
 the City of Fleurimont
 the City of Lennoxville
 the City of Rock Forest
 the Municipality of Saint-Élie-d'Orford
 the City of Sherbrooke
 the City of Waterville

On January 1, 2002, all of the above except Waterville amalgamated into the newly expanded City of Sherbooke, as part of the 2001–2002 municipal reorganization in Quebec.  Waterville remained independent and moved to Coaticook Regional County Municipality.

The City of Bromptonville and the Township of Brompton joined Sherbrooke Regional County Municipality on June 12, 1996. Until then, both had been parts of Le Val-Saint-François Regional County Municipality. They merged to form the new City of Bromptonville on December 30, 1998. Bromptonville merged into the new City of Sherbrooke on January 1, 2002 and became the borough of Brompton, but part of the former city was annexed to Stoke instead.

See also
 Municipal history of Quebec
 Boroughs of Sherbrooke

External links

References

Former regional county municipalities in Quebec
Populated places disestablished in 2002